Pteris parkeri, the silver ribbon fern, is a species of evergreen fern in the family Pteridaceae, native to Japan, Taiwan and Korea.

References

parkeri
Ferns of Asia
Garden plants of Asia
House plants